Pennsville may refer to:

Pennsville Township, New Jersey
Pennsville (CDP), New Jersey
Pennsville, Ohio, an unincorporated community